Herbert Numa (22 June 1925 – 17 April 1984) was an Australian cricketer. He played 16 first-class cricket matches for Victoria between 1946 and 1954.

See also
 List of Victoria first-class cricketers

References

External links
 

1925 births
1984 deaths
Australian cricketers
Victoria cricketers
Cricketers from Melbourne